Beau Ryan (born 11 May 1985) is an Australian former professional rugby league footballer, television presenter, actor and singer who played for the Cronulla-Sutherland Sharks and the Wests Tigers in the National Rugby League. Ryan is also well known for his comedic work on The Footy Show. On 5 June 2014, Beau Ryan announced his immediate retirement whilst on The Footy Show, due to a neck injury. Beau Ryan released a single, "Where You From?" featuring Justice Crew on 19 September 2014.

Currently, Ryan is the host of Network 10's reality series The Amazing Race Australia.

Early career 
Ryan is of distant Irish heritage and was raised in Albion Park and played junior football with Wests Illawarra. In 2003, Ryan was selected to represent in the New South Wales Schoolboys team. In 2005 he won the Jersey Flegg Cup with the St. George Illawarra Dragons team under coach Steve Price, but left the club as he was behind centres Matt Cooper, Mark Gasnier and Wes Naiqama.

Television/radio career
From 2009, Ryan began making regular "comedic" appearances on The Footy Show, and in 2010 started his own "comedy" segment, "Beau Knows...". He has also created two popular characters; DJ Yallah, an Egyptian-Australian DJ from Bankstown and Donnie Palmer, a Titans trainer who is obsessed with doing stretches. Other material includes sketches mocking fellow NRL players.

Former coach Tim Sheens said of Ryan's television appearances, "Some players play golf on their day off. He goes and has some fun doing some television. At the moment, TV is his interest and good luck to him as long as it doesn't overtake his football." Ryan continued on The Footy Show, with a larger role in 2012.

In early June 2016 Ryan was involved in controversial segment on The Footy Show which viewers deemed "racist" and "abhorrent". The Nine Network issued an apology for the segment.

Ryan has advertising contracts for several clothing lines.

In 2017 Ryan started filming for the new NRL/AFL cross code movie called “Chasing Comets” which was written and produced by fellow ex-NRL player Jason Stevens. Ryan featured in the movie as a rugby league player called Tom who played on the Comets team. The movie was released to Australian and New Zealand cinemas in 2018 and premiered on Network Ten in 2019. This movie was Beau Ryan's debut of acting in a film.

In 2018 Beau Ryan co-hosted a breakfast radio show with John Stanley on the ill-fated Macquarie Sports Radio network. Beau was let go, replaced by ex-footballer Mark "Piggy" Riddell.

In 2019, he was announced as the host of Network 10's revival of The Amazing Race Australia, replacing Grant Bowler, who hosted the earlier Seven Network iteration of the show.

Professional playing career

Wests Tigers
Ryan joined the Wests Tigers and made his debut in round 16 of the 2007 NRL season. He played a further two games that year, scoring a try in his second appearance. The next season, he played in 15 games.

From 2009 onwards, Ryan was a regular winger for the Wests Tigers. He scored a personal best 13 tries that year, including seven tries in the last 4 games. Soon after, Ryan signed a contract to remain with the Tigers until the end of the 2012 season.

Injury hampered Ryan's season in 2011, and he didn't take his regular position on the wing until round 14. He scored 8 tries in the remaining 13 games, including the last try of the qualifying final match against St George Illawara as the Wests Tigers came from 12-6 down at half time to win 21–12.

Ryan started the 2012 season by scoring 4 tries in his first 3 games. Later in the season he played games in the centres and at fullback (two after late withdrawals by Tim Moltzen), and it was said, "many good judges rate him the most improved player in the game." He was one of the few players to play in all 24 games for the club in 2012, scoring 9 tries. He made 310 runs during the year, among the NRLs top twenty performers, and was named in the Prime Minister's XIII at the end of the regular season.

Having previously announced a contract extension on The Footy Show, Ryan later signed a three-year contract with the Cronulla Sharks. Ryan said, "I agreed to a three-year deal but never received any formal documentation...I never got the opportunity to sign anything."

Cronulla-Sutherland Sharks
Ryan started playing for the Cronulla-Sutherland Sharks in the 2013 NRL season, during which the club was being investigated by ASADA. In the finals for this season, he scored a controversial 7th tackle try against the North Queensland Cowboys. This try would soon decide the match and retrospectively, knocked the Cowboys out of the competition.

On 5 June 2014, Ryan announced his immediate retirement from rugby league on The NRL Footy Show, due to an ongoing neck injury.

Music career
Ryan released his debut single titled "Where You From?" featuring Justice Crew on 19 September 2014. It was released through Sony Music Australia. It debuted at number 19 on the ARIA Singles Chart.

Personal life
Ryan and longtime partner, Kara Orrell announced to Woman's Day they were expecting their first child and engaged to be married in August 2012. The couple married on 14 October 2012, and Kara gave birth to their daughter Remi in January 2013.

In September 2015 a story appeared in a magazine that Ryan had been involved in an affair with former Hi-5 singer Lauren Brant. Brant's fiancé at the time stated that she admitted to the relationship while she and Ryan were appearing together in a Sydney Theatre production. Ryan took leave from The Footy Show to spend time with his family with a Nine Network source saying he had issues he was dealing with. He was removed by Woolworths as the face of an advertising campaign. Ryan returned to The Footy Show in October and neither denied nor admitted to the alleged affair but he apologised to people who had been hurt. In an interview in 2016 he admitted knowing his wife was hurt and that he was embarrassed.

Discography

Singles

Footnotes

External links

Beau Ryan at the Rugby League Project

1985 births
Living people
Australian people of Irish descent
Australian rugby league players
Australian television personalities
Balmain Ryde-Eastwood Tigers players
Cronulla-Sutherland Sharks players
Prime Minister's XIII players
Rugby league centres
Rugby league fullbacks
Rugby league players from Wollongong
Rugby league wingers
Western Suburbs Magpies NSW Cup players
Wests Tigers players
I'm a Celebrity...Get Me Out of Here! (Australian TV series) participants